"Stars Are Blind" is a song recorded by American television personality and socialite Paris Hilton for her debut studio album, Paris (2006). It was released as the lead single from the album on June 5, 2006, by Warner Bros. Records. The song was written by Fernando Garibay, Sheppard Solomon and Ralph McCarthy, and produced by Garibay with additional production by Solomon. Jennifer Karr was the vocal arranger and background vocalist for the song. 

"Stars Are Blind" was well received by music critics. It debuted at its peak of number 18 on the US Billboard Hot 100 due to strong digital sales and topped the Billboard Dance Club Songs chart. Worldwide, the single topped the charts in Hungary, Scotland, and Slovakia while reaching the top 10 in Australia, Canada, Venezuela, and more than 10 European countries.

A reggaeton remix featuring the Puerto Rican duo Wisin & Yandel was released in Latin America, receiving heavy airplay and achieving club success in countries like Colombia, Ecuador, Chile and Venezuela.

Critical response
"Stars Are Blind" received critical acclaim from music critics. Stephen Thomas Erlewine from AllMusic called it "a breezy track". Sal Cinquemani from Slant says that "Paris's debut single, 'Stars Are Blind' (which was commissioned to bridge the gap between the hip-hop and rock-inflected tunes on the album), has been the surprise of the summer, Nelly Furtado's 'Promiscuous' notwithstanding; it's a sunny, reggae-hued love song that has eclipsed new singles by some of music's biggest stars". Leah Greenblatt from Entertainment Weekly called it "a summery island groove". Alexis Petridis from The Guardian said that "on 'Stars Are Blind', the combination of tinny cod-reggae and your-call-is-being-held-in-a-queue vocal technique results in something so plasticky, it's perversely enjoyable". Mark Daniels from Yahoo! Music said, "Even the plinky pop-reggae, never a good look, of single 'Stars Are Blind' manages to ingratiate itself eventually". Ernest Baker from Complex listed the song as one of the "50 Awesome Guilty Pleasure Songs We're Ashamed to Like (But Not Really)", and stated that "the song was like a tropical escape from her tabloid headline persona. Instead, you had what seemed liked sincere emotions from the socialite incorporated into a ridiculously well-written record, over spot-on production. 'Stars Are Blind' was a flash in the pan, a fluke, but an incredible one. We'll never get something like this from Paris Hilton again". He finished saying that this was Hilton's greatest contribution to society.

Music video
The accompanying music video for "Stars Are Blind" was shot in two days in May 2006, in Malibu, California, and was directed by Chris Applebaum. The video for the song features many images of her walking and rolling around on the beach with a lover. It premiered on June 6, 2006 on MTV. Hilton later posted the video on her official YouTube channel in August 2006. "Shooting the music video was so much fun, and I had the best time doing it, and was so proud when it came out and everyone loved it so much", said Hilton. The video was listed as one of the 50 worst videos of all time by NME at number 49. The magazine stated, "So this is what you can do when your daddy has buckets of money – pay someone to film you roll around in a bikini in the sand with a guy in order to distract us from the fact that you've been auto-tuned (quite poorly) to high heaven. Good on you, Paris Hilton – you successfully created something that sucked more than the song itself (which, frankly, we thought would be impossible to do).

A second version of the video was shot for the European and Latin American countries, featuring Hilton's lover (played by Lucas Babin) from the beach as her photographer at a photoshoot. In this version, scenes from the beach are still present, but exist as Hilton's fantasies during the photoshoot. At the end of the video, she wins the affection of her photographer, but ends up just taking his keys and stealing his car. The second version premiered on Z100's website on July 5, 2006.

Legal controversy
In June 2007, the copyright holders of the 1970 song "Kingston Town", Sparta Florida Music Group, started legal action against Hilton and Warner Chappell Music for plagiarism due to alleged similarities between "Stars Are Blind" and "Kingston Town". The two songs use the same chord progression in the verses. It has wrongly been ascribed that UB40 was the suing party, but that has been denied by the band themselves on their website. The suit appears to have been settled out of court.

Covers and versions
Upon its original release, several remix compilations were released. Among these included a Tracy Young remix and a collaboration with Wisin & Yandel. The song reached the top of the Dance Club Songs chart. Hilton's friend, German singer Kim Petras, performed a cover of the song and posted it online. An updated version of the song, "Stars Are Blind (Paris' Version)", was released exclusively to Amazon Music on December 30, 2022.

In popular culture
The song appears in the film Lynn + Lucy, where the characters dance to it in a local nightclub.
The song appears in the film Promising Young Woman, where the characters Cassie (Carey Mulligan) and Ryan (Bo Burnham) dance to it in a pharmacy.

Track listing

 Digital download
 "Stars Are Blind" — 3:56

 Digital download (U.S. Maxi Single)
 "Stars Are Blind" (Luny Tunes Remix featuring Wisin and Yandel) — 4:16
 "Stars Are Blind" (Chus & Ceballos Stereo Remix) [Edit] — 4:53
 "Stars Are Blind" (The Scumfrog's Extreme Makeover Edit) — 4:57
 "Stars Are Blind" (Tracy Does Paris Club Mix) [Edit] — 4:54
 "Stars Are Blind" (Tracy Does Paris Dub) [Edit] — 4:58
 "Stars Are Blind" (Tracy Does Paris Radio Remix) — 3:34

 US CD single
 "Stars Are Blind" (Luny Tunes Remix featuring Wisin and Yandel) — 4:19
 "Stars Are Blind" (Tracy Does Paris Club Mix) — 9:12
 "Stars Are Blind" (Chus & Ceballos Stereo Remix) — 8:13
 "Stars Are Blind" (The Scumfrog's Extreme Makeover) — 9:00
 "Stars Are Blind" (Tracy Does Paris Mixshow) — 6:46
 "Stars Are Blind" (Tracy Does Paris Radio Remix) — 3:34

 US 12-inch vinyl
 "Stars Are Blind" (Tracy Does Paris Club Mix) — 9:12
 "Stars Are Blind" (Luny Tunes Remix featuring Wisin and Yandel) — 4:19
 "Stars Are Blind" (Chus & Ceballos Stereo Remix) — 8:13
 "Stars Are Blind" (The Scumfrog's Extreme Makeover) — 9:00
 "Stars Are Blind" (Chus & Ceballos Stereo Dub) — 8:31
 "Stars Are Blind" (Tracy Does Paris Dub) — 6:21

 Canadian and German CD single
 "Stars Are Blind" — 3:57
 "Stars Are Blind" (Luny Tunes Remix featuring Wisin and Yandel) — 4:19
 "Stars Are Blind" (Tracy Does Paris Club Mix) — 9:12
 "Stars Are Blind" (Chus & Ceballos Stereo Remix) — 8:13
 "Stars Are Blind" (The Scumfrog's Extreme Makeover) — 9:00

 UK CD single 1
 "Stars Are Blind" — 3:57
 "Stars Are Blind" (Tracy Does Paris Radio Remix) — 3:34

 UK CD single 2
 "Stars Are Blind" — 3:57
 "Stars Are Blind" (Luny Tunes Remix featuring Wisin and Yandel) — 4:19
 "Stars Are Blind" (Tracy Does Paris Club Mix) — 9:12
 "Stars Are Blind" (Chus & Ceballos Stereo Remix) — 8:13
 "Stars Are Blind" (The Scumfrog's Extreme Makeover) — 9:00
 "Stars Are Blind" (Video)

 UK 12-inch picture disc
 "Stars Are Blind" — 3:57
 "Stars Are Blind" (Tracy Does Paris Radio Remix) — 3:34
 "Stars Are Blind" (Chus & Ceballos Stereo Remix) — 8:13

 Japanese CD single
 "Stars Are Blind" — 3:57
 "Stars Are Blind" (Chus & Ceballos Stereo Remix) — 8:13

Charts

Weekly charts

Year-end charts

Certifications

Release history

References

External links
 Music video on VEVO

2006 debut singles
2006 songs
American reggae songs
Black-and-white music videos
Music videos directed by Chris Applebaum
Number-one singles in Hungary
Number-one singles in Scotland
Number-one singles in Slovakia
Paris Hilton songs
Song recordings produced by Luny Tunes
Songs involved in plagiarism controversies
Songs written by Fernando Garibay
Songs written by Sheppard Solomon